There is also a Diocese of Barisal (and a Bishop of Barisal) in the united Church of Bangladesh.
The Roman Catholic Diocese of Barisal is a Latin suffragan bishopric in the ecclesiastical province of the Metropolitan of Roman Catholic Archdiocese of Chittagong. However it remains dependent on the missionary Roman Congregation for the Evangelization of Peoples.

Its cathedral episcopal see is St. Peter's Cathedral, in Barisal.

Statistics 
As per 2015, it pastorally served 29,685 Catholics (0.2% of 15,183,927 total) on 20,708 km2 in 5 parishes with 19 priests (13 diocesan, 6 religious), 33 lay religious (4 brothers, 29 sisters) and 3 seminarians.

History 
Established on 29 December 2015 as Diocese of Barisal, on territory split off from Diocese of Chittagong, suffragan of the Metropolitan Archdiocese of Dhaka.

Since Chittagong was promoted to Metropolitan Archdiocese in February 2017, Barisal become one of its two original suffragans.

Episcopal ordinaries
(all Latin Church, so far members of Latin missionary congregations)

Suffragan Bishops of Barisal 
 Lawrence Subrata Howlader, Holy Cross Fathers (C.S.C.) (2015.12.29 – 2021.02.19); previously Titular Bishop of Afufenia (2009.05.07 – 2015.12.29) & Auxiliary Bishop of mother diocese Chittagong
 Emmanuel Kanon Rozario (2022.06.21 – ...)

References

Sources and external links 
 catholic-hierarchy 
 GCatholic 

Roman Catholic dioceses in Bangladesh
Roman Catholic Ecclesiastical Province of Chittagong
Christian organizations established in 2015
2015 establishments in Bangladesh